Wilhelm Lothar Maria, Freiherr von Kerpen (24 May 1741 – 26 December 1823) joined the army of Habsburg Austria and rose to the rank of general officer during the French Revolutionary Wars. He led a brigade under Prince Josias of Saxe-Coburg-Saalfeld during the War of the First Coalition. In the spring of 1796 he transferred to Italy where he commanded a brigade at the start of the Montenotte Campaign. Later that year he was ordered to help defend the County of Tyrol. After being promoted to Feldmarschall-Leutnant, he led a force against Barthélemy Catherine Joubert's French corps at Salorno, Klausen, and Brixen in March 1797. That year he became Proprietor (Inhaber) of Infantry Regiment Nr. 49, a position he held until his death.

Kerpen was deputy to the commanding general of Bohemia from 1803 to 1807. He became Imperial Privy Councilor and Chamberlain in 1807. He was commanding general of Inner Austria from 1807 to 1809, during which time he received promotion to Feldzeugmeister. He served as Vice President of the Aulic Council from January 1810 to November 1813. In the latter year he retired from military service. He died at Vienna in 1823, having never married.

References

1741 births
1823 deaths
People from Enzkreis
Austrian soldiers
Austrian generals
Austrian Empire military leaders of the French Revolutionary Wars
Austrian Empire commanders of the Napoleonic Wars
Barons of Austria
Military leaders of the French Revolutionary Wars